Sergei Voloshin (born February 18, 1953) is a Russian-American experimental high-energy nuclear physicist and Professor of Physics at Wayne State University. He is best known for his work on event-by-event physics in heavy ion collisions.

Career
Sergei Voloshin studied physics at Moscow Engineering Physics Institute, where he completed his PhD in nuclear physics in 1980 and became a faculty member at the Department of Theoretical Physics. During the period from 1992 to 1999 he was a visiting scientist at the University of Pittsburgh, Physikalische Institute (University of Heidelberg) and Lawrence Berkeley National Laboratory (LBNL) where he worked on anisotropic flow and event-by-event physics in nuclear collisions at SPS and RHIC. In 1999 Dr. Voloshin joined the Department of Physics and Astronomy at Wayne State University.

Work
One of the best known Voloshin's contribution is the analysis and interpretation of the so-called anisotropic flow in heavy ion collisions. He played a leading role in the discovery of the strong elliptic flow at RHIC. Large elliptic flow, consistent with calculations from ideal hydrodynamics, was a key to the concept of strongly interacting Quark Gluon Plasma, a new form of matter discovered at RHIC. The idea of the constituent quark scaling, proposed by Voloshin, and its observation at RHIC is widely regarded as a proof for a deconfinement phase transition. His recent research interests include studies of possible local parity violation in strong interaction in heavy ion collisions.

Dr. Voloshin is a member of the STAR Collaboration performing experiments at Relativistic Heavy Ion Collider (RHIC) at Brookhaven National Laboratory (BNL), and the ALICE Collaboration at Large Hadron Collider (LHC) at CERN.

Honors
Elected a Fellow of American Physical Society in 2008 "for numerous seminal contributions to the methods and interpretation of collective flow in relativistic nuclear collisions”.
Inducted to Wayne State University's Academy of Scholars in 2012.

References

External links

Homepage at Wayne State University
The Relativistic Heavy Ion Collider at Brookhaven National Laboratory
The Alice Experiment at CERN
STAR Experiment at Brookhaven National Laboratory
Scientific publications of Sergei Voloshin on INSPIRE-HEP

1953 births
Living people
21st-century American physicists
Moscow Engineering Physics Institute alumni
University of Pittsburgh faculty
Wayne State University faculty
Brookhaven National Laboratory staff
Lawrence Berkeley National Laboratory people
People associated with CERN
People from Donetsk
Fellows of the American Physical Society